Rainbow Syndrome is the second studio album and first major Korean release by South Korean girl group Rainbow. The album was split into two parts, with the first being released on February 13, 2013, containing six songs. "Tell Me Tell Me" was used to promote the release. The second installment was released on June 4, 2013 containing seven songs. "Sunshine" was used to promote the second part.

History

Part 1
Following promotions of the repackage of So Girls, the group promoted in Japan for the remainder of 2011, along with most of 2012. In January 2012 however, a sub-unit consisting of Jisook, HyunYoung and Seungah called Rainbow Pixie promoted single "Hoi Hoi". Later in the year, Hyun Young was diagnosed with a vocal cord polyp and underwent surgery for its removal. The group ended up not promoting together for a year and ten months in Korea, until this album. On January 22, DSP confirmed the groups return in February 2013, revealing a brand new concept photo on January 29. The album track list was revealed in a "Tracklist Video" featuring Woo-ri rapping the song titles in a cover of Azealia Banks' single "212".

Part 2
DSP confirmed on May 22, 2013 that the group would be returning after almost 4 months with the release of "Part 2" of the album on June 5, 2013. The concept and style of the title track, "Sunshine" was described as "fun and colorful, and perfect for the summer season". The jacket photo and track list was released a few days later.

Track listing

Chart performance

Album chart

Part 1

Part 2

Total sales

Singles

Other charted songs

Release history

References

External links 
  

2013 albums
Rainbow (girl group) albums
DSP Media albums
Rainbow Syndrome Part 1
Rainbow Syndrome Part 2
Korean-language albums